The United Democratic Party (UDP) was a political party in British Guiana led by John Carter.

History
The UDP was established in 1955 by a merger of the National Democratic Party and other factions. In the 1957 elections the party put forward eight candidates for the 14 constituencies. It received 8% of the vote, winning one seat; Rudy Kendall in New Amsterdam.

In 1959 the party merged into the People's National Congress.

References

Defunct political parties in Guyana
Political parties established in 1955
1955 establishments in British Guiana
Political parties disestablished in 1959
1959 disestablishments in British Guiana